Harry Hibbs (September 11, 1942December 21, 1989) was Newfoundland's best-known icon for traditional Newfoundland music.

He was born Henry Thomas Joseph Hibbs, September 11, 1942 on Bell Island, Dominion of Newfoundland.  He was educated at St. Kevin's High School, Wabana, and moved with his family to Toronto shortly after the death of his father. There, Harry worked at various manufacturing facilities such as an auto parts factory, printing plant, and a munitions factory. At one of these plants he suffered a career changing accident that prevented him from any strenuous work; this led Harry to take up performing music. He had learned this skill from his father, who was an accomplished fiddle player and also played accordion. In addition, His mother had taught him to sing Irish ballads.

Hibbs became a member of the Caribou Show Band that played regularly to expatriate Newfoundlanders living in Toronto. Members of the band at that time were Johnny Burke on bass guitar, Norma Gale, vocals, Brian Barron, mandolin and fiddle, Roddy Lee on drums, Bob Lucier on steel guitar and Harry Hibbs on accordion. Hibbs was signed to Arc Records by Phil Anderson, president of Arc Records, and the first album released in October 1968 with signature song "The Black Velvet Band". In 1968 a weekly television show called At the Caribou featuring Hibbs aired on CHCH-TV in Hamilton. Hibbs appeared on many television programs such as The Tommy Hunter Show, Singalong Jubilee and Don Messer's Jubilee.

Hibbs went on to record 26 albums, of which several went gold. He opened his own nightclub, the Conception Bay, in Toronto in 1978. Hibbs died in Toronto on December 21, 1989 of cancer. Steve Fruitman of CIUT-FM created the Porcupine Award in 1990 for those who deserve recognition for their work in Canadian folklore music. In 1991 the Harry Hibbs Award was inaugurated and its first recipient was Geoff Meeker. This award was eventually renamed the Harry Hibbs Award for Perseverance. In 1993 Harry Hibbs was inducted into the Porcupine Hall of Fame.

References
Citations

External links
 Harry Hibbs - Encyclopedia of Newfoundland and Labrador v. 2, p. 932
 Harry Hibbs - Heritage Newfoundland and Labrador
 The Porcupine Awards Hall of Fame

1942 births
1989 deaths
Canadian folk singer-songwriters
Musicians from Newfoundland and Labrador
Deaths from cancer in Ontario
20th-century Canadian male singers
Canadian male singer-songwriters
20th-century Canadian male musicians